RKF may refer to:
Runge-Kutta-Fehlberg Method
RKFDV